The March 83G is a IMSA GTP/Group C sports prototype race car, designed, developed and built by British manufacturer and constructor March Engineering, for sports car racing (specifically both the IMSA GT Championship and World Sportscar Championship), in 1983.

References

Racing cars
March vehicles
Sports prototypes
IMSA GTP cars
Group C cars